The 1958 Harvard Crimson football team was an American football team that represented Harvard University as a member of the Ivy League during the 1958 NCAA University Division football season. 

In their second year under head coach John Yovicsin, the Crimson compiled a 4–5 record and outscored opponents 149 to 99. Robert T. Shaunessy was the team captain.

Harvard's 3–4 conference record placed sixth in the Ivy League. The Crimson outscored Ivy opponents 126 to 93. 

Harvard played its home games at Harvard Stadium in the Allston neighborhood of Boston, Massachusetts.

Schedule

References

Harvard
Harvard Crimson football seasons
Harvard Crimson football
1950s in Boston